Canarium decumanum is a tree in the family Burseraceae. The specific epithet  is from the Latin meaning "greatest", referring to the tree's size.

Description
The grey bark is smooth to scaly. The flowers are yellow-brown.

Distribution and habitat
Canarium decumanum grows naturally in Borneo, the Moluccas and New Guinea. Its habitat is lowland forests.

References

decumanum
Trees of the Maluku Islands
Trees of New Guinea
Trees of Borneo
Plants described in 1790